Calliotropis ambigua is a species of sea snail, a marine gastropod mollusk in the family Eucyclidae.

This species is considered by Dautzenberg & Fischer (1906) as a synonym of Calliotropis vaillanti (Fischer, 1882) but tentatively maintained as separate species by Vilvens & Swennen (2008)

References

External links
 To World Register of Marine Species

ambigua
Gastropods described in 1896